Stanleytown may refer to:

Stanleytown, Rhondda Cynon Taf, village in Wales
Stanleytown, Virginia, census-designated place in Henry County, United States
Stanleytown, Scott County, Virginia, United States